The Great Escape is the fourth album by Swedish progressive metal band Seventh Wonder. It was recorded over the Spring and Summer of 2010, and was released on December 3, 2010. It is also the last album recorded with Johnny Sandin on drums, as he left the band due to personal reasons after the recording and subsequent shows. "Alley Cat" is the first Seventh Wonder song to have an accompanying music video from the band.

The 30-minute title track The Great Escape is the first (and so far only) song by the band to be longer than 10 minutes. It is an epic song based on the poems 'Aniara' by Swedish Nobel laureate Harry Martinson. It deals with the tragedy of a spaceship which, originally bound for Mars with a cargo of surviving colonists from a ravaged and destroyed Earth, is ejected from the solar system and becomes entangled in an existential struggle. The first track 'Wiseman' doubles loosely as a prequel to the events of 'The Great Escape'.

Track listing
Lyrics by Blomqvist/Karevik. Music & arrangements by Seventh Wonder.

Personnel
All information from the album booklet.

Seventh Wonder
Tommy Karevik – vocals, lyrics
Andreas Söderin – keyboard
Johan Liefvendahl – guitar
Andreas Blomqvist – bass, lyrics
Johnny Sandin – drums

Additional musicians
Johan Larsson – additional vocals, recording, cover art, photography
Arto Järvela – violin on "King of Whitewater"
Jenny Karevik – female vocals

Production
Erik Mårtensson – mixing, mastering

References

2010 albums
Seventh Wonder albums